Scrophularia grandiflora is a species of flowering plant in the figwort family (Scrophulariaceae) endemic to Portugal.

Description
Petals are pinkish-flesh, upper lip is purple pink. Anthers are yellow, sometimes with bluish margins. Staminode is purple. Seed capsule is ovoid, very hard when mature and is brown or greenish brown. Seeds are brown-blackish.

Distribution and habitat
Scrophularia grandiflora is endemic to central west Portugal, mainly in the districts of Coimbra and Leiria, and partially on Santarém and Lisbon where it inhabits slopes and shoulders of paths, empty spaces and forest edges, preferably in shady, humid and somewhat disturbed places. Usually  altitude but is also found at much lower sites. Its habitat is focused largely on the area around Coimbra.

References

grandiflora
Endemic flora of Portugal
Endemic flora of the Iberian Peninsula
Flora of Southwestern Europe
Taxobox binomials not recognized by IUCN